The East Suffolk Militia was one of two regiments of militia raised in Suffolk. Formed in 1759 it was converted in 1853 to an Artillery Militia unit, which was eventually disbanded in 1909.

History
The Militia Act of 1757 established militia regiments for each county and required each parish to provide a number of able-bodied men, aged between 18 and 50 (reduced to 45 in 1762) for military training. Militia regiments served in Britain or Ireland but not overseas. Men had to serve for three years (for five years after 1786). As well as the East Suffolk Militia, the county also raised the West Suffolk Militia. In 1831 the East Suffolk Militia became the East Suffolk Light Infantry Militia.

In May 1853 the Militia was reorganised with the East Suffolk being converted into an Artillery unit. The Corps of Artillery was designated The Suffolk Artillery Militia and had its headquarters at Ipswich. The unit had a purpose built artillery barracks in Ipswich which were completed in 1855. The first commanding officer was Colonel Robert A Shafto Adair MP, who later became Robert Adair, 1st Baron Waveney. It became the 3rd Brigade, Eastern Division, Royal Artillery, in 1882 and then the Suffolk Artillery (Eastern Division), RA in 1889.

The unit was embodied during the Crimean War (1855-6), the Indian Mutiny (1859-1860) and during the South African War (1900) but never served overseas. By 1893 the War Office Mobilisation Scheme had allocated the Suffolk Militia Artillery Volunteers to the Harwich fixed defences. The unit was redesignated as The Suffolk Royal Garrison Artillery (Militia) in 1902. It was transferred to the Special Reserve Royal Field Artillery in 1908 on the formation of the Territorial Force and disbanded the following year.

References

Bibliography

 Litchfield, Norman E H, 1987.  The Militia Artillery 1852-1909, The Sherwood Press, Nottingham. 

History of the British Army
Suffolk
Military units and formations disestablished in 1909
History of Suffolk